Andrea Centurione Chiariti (Genoa, 1471 - Genoa, 1546) was the 53rd Doge of the Republic of Genoa.

Biography 
After covering several minor figures in public life he was appointed procurator of the Republic from 1537 together with Giovanni Battista Lercari, future doge in the biennium 1563-1565. On January 4, 1543 he succeeded Leonardo Cattaneo della Volta at the head of the dogal power, the fifty-third in the history of the Genoese republic and the eighth after the biennial reform.

Among the most important works in his mandate is certainly the reconstruction of the Genoa lantern during 1543, with funding from the Bank of Saint George, seriously damaged by the bombing of the Genoese insurgents against the French invasion of 1513 during the dogate of Ottaviano Fregoso.

His office ended on January 4, 1545 with the appointment of his successor Giovanni Battista De Fornari. He died in Genoa shortly after the dogate, in the course of 1546. His body was buried in the church of Sant'Agostino.

See also 

 Doge of Genoa
 Republic of Genoa

References 

1471 births
1546 deaths
16th-century Doges of Genoa